The Caller of the Black is a collection of stories by British writer  Brian Lumley.  It was released in 1971 and was the author's first collection of stories published by Arkham House.  It was published in an edition of 3,606 copies.  Many of the stories are of the Cthulhu Mythos.

Contents

The Caller of the Black contains the following stories:

 "A Thing About Cars!"
 "The Cyprus Shell"
 "Billy's Oak"
 "The Writer in the Garret"
 "The Caller of the Black"
 "The Mirror of Nitocris"
 "The Night Sea Maid Went Down"
 "The Thing from the Blasted Heath"
 "An Item of Supporting Evidence"
 "Dylath-Leen"
 "De Marigny's Clock"
 "Ambler's Inspiration"
 "In the Vaults Beneath"
 "The Pearl"

Sources

1971 short story collections
Fantasy short story collections 
Horror short story collections
Cthulhu Mythos short stories
Short stories by Brian Lumley
Arkham House books